, better known by his stage name of Afra, is a Japanese beatboxer from Suita, Osaka. He formed the beatboxing band Afra & Incredible Beatbox Band in 2005 with Kei and K-Moon. He had a guest appearance alongside Kōichi Yamadera in the eighth episode of the anime Samurai Champloo as the voice of the beatboxing Shinpachi.

Discography
 2003: Always Fresh Rhythm Attack
 2004: Digital Breath (with Prefuse 73)
 2006: I.B.B. (as Afra & Incredible Beatbox Band)
 2009: Heart Beat

References

External links
 Profile at Oddjob Records
 Afra on Myspace
 Jason Tom and Afra

1980 births
Japanese beatboxers
Japanese male musicians
Living people
Musicians from Osaka Prefecture
People from Suita